The 1881 Penn Quakers football team represented the University of Pennsylvania in the 1881 college football season. They finished with a 0–5 record, managing to only score a single point.

Schedule

References

Penn
Penn Quakers football seasons
College football winless seasons
Penn Quakers football